White Mountain Mall is a shopping mall located in Rock Springs, Wyoming owned and managed by Brookfield Properties. It is one of only three enclosed malls in the entire state of Wyoming. The mall, which opened in 1978, is located near Interstate 80/U.S. Route 30/191, and features over 40 stores. The anchor stores are Star Stadium 11 + ARQ, Jo-Ann Fabrics, Murdoch's Ranch & Home Supply, Ross Dress for Less, Shoe Dept. Encore, TJ Maxx,  Petco, and Dunham sports.

History
The mall opened in 1978 with JCPenney, Herberger's, Ernst Home & Garden and F.W. Woolworth Company among its tenants. Built by Price Development of Salt Lake City, Utah, it was the first enclosed shopping mall in the state of Wyoming.

Ernst's space was later a Walmart, and then Flaming Gorge Harley-Davidson. Now it is both Ross Dress for Less  and Jo-Ann Fabrics

The mall flooded on September 27, 2011, due to a water pipe bursting. On January 12, 2016, JCPenney announced its store will be closing its doors in Spring 2016. Both TJ Maxx & Petco now occupy the space that previously housed JCPenney.

On April 18, 2018, it was announced that Herberger's would also be closing as parent company The Bon-Ton Stores was going out of business. The store closed on August 29, 2018. In June 2021, work started on the former Herberger's space it being converted into a Dunham Sports store. It opened on October 29, 2021, being the first in Wyoming.

References

External links
Official website

Brookfield Properties
Shopping malls in Wyoming
Shopping malls established in 1978
Buildings and structures in Rock Springs, Wyoming
Tourist attractions in Sweetwater County, Wyoming